Drury Nunatak is a bare, black, isolated nunatak standing up boldly from the ice at the head of Lauritzen Bay, 1.5 nautical miles (3 km) northwest of Reynolds Peak. The feature was observed and charted on 20 February 1959, by the Australian National Antarctic Research Expeditions led by Phillip Law, and was named by the Antarctic Names Committee of Australia for Alan Campbell-Drury, Photographic Officer of the Antarctic Division who accompanied this expedition.

References 

Nunataks of Antarctica